Chapo Trap House is an American left-wing political podcast founded in March 2016 and hosted by Will Menaker, Matt Christman and Felix Biederman with Amber A'Lee Frost as a recurring co-host. The show is produced by Chris Wade and formerly by Brendan James. The podcast is aligned with the dirtbag left, a style of contentious left-wing political discourse that eschews civility in favor of a more casual—and often vulgar—speaking style. The show's creators published The Chapo Guide to Revolution in August 2018, with the book debuting at number six on The New York Times Best Seller list.

Content
The Chapo hosts and producers identify with radical left-wing politics and frequently deride conservative, neoliberal, moderate, and liberal pundits. Writing for The New York Times, Nikil Saval called Chapo Trap House and its hosts "prime originators of the far left's liberal-bashing". The Pacific Standard wrote: Contemporary conservatism is the butt of many jokes on Chapo, but the harshest critiques are often saved for the Democratic Party (and for contemporary liberalism more generally). Chapo has managed to strip away the layers standard of political discourse to highlight the brutality behind policies such as "double-tap" airstrikes and for-profit health care. Biederman said the show's audience is seeking alternatives to liberal media, which he calls "the dominion of either upper-middle-class smugness when it's even the least bit funny and insufferable self-righteousness when it's even the least bit conscious". Similarly, Christman said that leftist perspectives in media tend toward either the "smug above-it-all snark of The Daily Show or the quaver-voiced earnestness of, like, Chris Hedges or something. Neither of those models offer the visceral thrill of listening to people who actually give a shit (as opposed to the wan liberalism of people who are mostly interested in showing how much smarter they are than Republicans)". Menaker has said that Chapo is meant to be in "marked contrast to the utterly humorless and bloodless path that leads many people with liberal or leftist proclivities into the trap of living in constant fear of offending some group that you're not a part of, up to and including the ruling class".

Chapo Trap House is dense with inside jokes and hyper-specific references to ongoing political discussion on Twitter. The hosts are associated with Twitter communities called "Left Twitter" and "Weird Twitter", a name used to describe a loose group of Twitter users known for absurdist humor.

Format and availability
An episode of Chapo Trap House usually lasts between 60 and 80 minutes. Episodes are typically structured with a prepared "cold open", an interview with a guest, and commentary on current events. In post-production, relevant audio samples are interspersed into the episode's discussion. The theme song—and inspiration for the show's title—is "SALUTE 2 EL CHAPO PART 1" by DJ Smokey. The show has a reading series which usually features texts by conservative and neoliberal writers, such as Ross Douthat, Ben Shapiro, Dennis Prager, and Rod Dreher.

Weekly free episodes of the show are available via SoundCloud, Spotify, and iTunes, among other services. Subscribers who contribute at least $5 per month via Patreon gain access to additional weekly premium bonus episodes. By May 2017, the show generated more than $60,000 a month from subscribers, and is as of February 2020 the highest-grossing user on Patreon, earning nearly $160,000 per month. Geek.com cited the show's premium content as an example of a viable revenue model for new podcasters.

History

Background and formation
The three founding hosts met online through discussions on Twitter years prior to starting the podcast. Under the usernames @willmenaker (Menaker); @cushbomb (Christman); and @ByYourLogic (Biederman, also formerly @swarthyvillain), they developed followings for their political commentary and have been called "minor Twitter celebrities". All had been politically motivated for several years.

The three first recorded together as guests on an episode of the podcast Street Fight Radio to mock the film 13 Hours: The Secret Soldiers of Benghazi. They had already discussed hosting a show together for some time, and, encouraged by positive reception to their Street Fight appearances, they created Chapo Trap House. They chose the name Chapo Trap House in the first episode as a joking reference to the Mexican drug lord Joaquín "El Chapo" Guzmán and a slang term for a drug house, intending the title to sound like the title of a rap mixtape.

Early years
The show came to prominence during the 2016 Democratic Party presidential primary contest between former United States Secretary of State Hillary Clinton and United States Senator Bernie Sanders. The show's left-wing content became popular with supporters of the democratic socialist Sanders.

The team behind the podcast has since expanded from the original three hosts. Brendan James joined as producer after appearing as a guest, and Virgil Texas and Amber A'Lee Frost joined the show as alternating co-hosts after the 2016 American presidential election. James left the show in November 2017, later being replaced by producer and writer Chris Wade.

The Chapo Guide to Revolution 
Biederman, Christman, James, Menaker, and Texas authored a satirical book about American politics, The Chapo Guide to Revolution: A Manifesto Against Logic, Facts, and Reason, published in August 2018 under the name Chapo Trap House. It debuted on The New York Times Best Seller list at number 6 under the Hardcover Non-Fiction category and number 7 under the Combined Print & E-Book category.

2020 election 
During the 2020 United States presidential election cycle, Chapo Trap House interviewed Democratic presidential candidates Marianne Williamson, Andrew Yang, John Delaney, Joe Sestak, Tom Steyer, and Bernie Sanders. In February 2020, The New York Times profiled the group's large live shows in early Democratic Party primary states, noting that they had "morphed into a touring political rally" for the election of Bernie Sanders.

Departure of Virgil Texas 

Virgil Texas started co-hosting the Bad Faith podcast with Briahna Joy Gray in September 2020. In May 2021, it was announced that Texas was leaving Chapo Trap House. The podcast's Patreon page described the parting as amicable.

Reception 
Avid fans of Chapo Trap House are called Grey Wolves, a joke referencing the neo-fascist, nationalist Turkish movement of the same name. 

A review of the second episode in The A.V. Club called the show "tremendously funny" and said "it feels like an absolutely essential listen". The reviewer cautioned prospective listeners that the show's left political perspective and amateur audio quality are "not for everyone", but said the hosts' "energy and desire to improve the political landscape of this country is not only unparalleled, but also contagious: if listening to this podcast doesn't make you want to become a more politically engaged person, it's hard to imagine what will". A subsequent A.V. Club review of the seventh episode noted the show's marked improvements in audio quality and the hosts' newfound confidence and flow in discussion, while retaining the "raw energy and urgency that has fueled the show from the get-go". The publication eventually named the episode of the show following the election of Donald Trump one of the best individual podcast episodes of the year 2016.

Mediaite called the show "consistently, absurdly funny and impressively literate on the diverse subjects it tackles", citing the hosts' "breadth of awareness about (seemingly) everything that's been published in every media outlet for the past few decades, and a depth of knowledge on various, arcane subjects". Paste described the show as "not deliberately offensive, but unapologetically honest ... so hilarious and delightfully vulgar I can barely stand it". Pacific Standard wrote, "Whether you think Chapo Trap House and its fans are bullies or righteously hilarious seems to come down to whether you think calling a Washington Post reporter 'smooth brain' is an acceptable move within the political discourse". The Irish Times commended its "more bracing and venomous approach to politics" than other podcasts and named the show one of the best podcasts of 2016.

The Advocate praised the show for its "scathing, hilarious, erudite analysis on politics and media from a far-left perspective", and favorably analogized the thrill of listening to how Alex Jones and Rush Limbaugh make their right-wing fans feel. Comedy website Splitsider recommended the episode featuring video editor Vic Berger, who did an in-depth interview about his surreal Vine and YouTube shorts covering the 2016 presidential election season.

In a 2016 column, Robby Soave of libertarian magazine Reason criticized the show as "apparently a group therapy session for Bernie bros". Soave wrote in reaction to host Will Menaker commenting on one of his tweets, saying that he believed Menaker had a hypocritical view of free-speech rights, and said the hosts "would gleefully applaud the silencing of everyone to their right". Soave later appeared as a guest on a premium episode of the podcast, "17 – The Road to Soavedom", in which he debated the hosts on freedom of speech in the media and the viability of public education.

The 2019 role-playing video game Disco Elysium features voice-acting cameos from Biederman, Christman, Menaker, and Texas. The creators of the game, Studio ZA/UM, lauded the podcast on Twitter, saying they had been "huge [Chapo] fans since the beginning".

Political influence 
In March 2019, it was revealed former U.S. Senator from Alaska Mike Gravel filed for an exploratory committee regarding a possible 2020 presidential campaign after being convinced to run by students David Oks, Henry Williams, and Elijah Emery, who learned about Gravel from Chapo Trap House. Gravel's formerly dormant Twitter account soon went viral after being used by the students to attack various politicians, including Democrats Amy Klobuchar, Cory Booker, Joe Biden, and Kamala Harris, in an effort to move discussion of the 2020 Democratic presidential candidates leftward. The Mike Gravel campaign performed an AMA on the r/Chapotraphouse subreddit on April 8, the day the campaign officially launched.

Italian weekly news magazine L'espresso attributed Chapo Trap House listenership with rising membership in the Democratic Socialists of America throughout early 2019, saying the podcast is  real and physical program, which is bringing thousands of young Americans to subscribing themselves to the DSA: the young Democratic Socialists of America".

Critique of the Democratic Party 
During the 2020 Democratic Party presidential primaries, The New York Times wrote about the Chapo Trap House hosts' characterizations of candidates challenging Vermont Senator and presidential candidate Bernie Sanders, the hosts' preferred candidate. The hosts called supporters of former Vice President Joe Biden "gelatinous 100-year-olds", referred to former Mayor Pete Buttigieg as "a bloodless asexual", and said former Mayor Michael Bloomberg should lose "so badly that this midget gremlin won't even have a shot even with a trillion dollars". When the hosts mentioned the name of Massachusetts Senator and presidential candidate Elizabeth Warren during a live event, the crowd hissed. According to the article, "the Sanders campaign maintains a close relationship with the podcast. His senior adviser, David Sirota, and his national press secretary, Briahna Joy Gray, have also been on the podcast". Describing the podcast's simultaneous intense criticism of the Warren 2020 presidential campaign and its associations with the Sanders campaign, Zach Beauchamp of Vox wrote, "If Sanders's fans are really serious about helping their guy, they need to think carefully about whether what they're doing is actually working".

On June 29, 2020, Reddit banned the unofficial Chapo Trap House subreddit, citing violations of Reddit's new community guidelines and the subreddit's persistent failure to moderate rule-breaking content. The hosts of Chapo Trap House have frequently repudiated this subreddit as well.

See also 
 List of Chapo Trap House episodes
Political podcast

References

External links 

 

2016 podcast debuts
American satire
Comedy and humor podcasts
Patreon creators
Socialism in the United States
Socialist podcasts
Weird Twitter
Audio podcasts
Talk show podcasts
American podcasts